The 2003 Super Fours was the second cricket Super Fours tournament. It took place in May and June and saw 4 teams made up of the top players in the county compete in a 50 over league. Knight Riders were the winners of the competition, achieving their first title.

Competition format
Teams played each other twice in a round-robin format, with the winners of the group winning the tournament. Matches were played using a one day format with 50 overs per side.

The group worked on a points system with positions within the divisions being based on the total points. 12 points were awarded for a win.

Teams

Results

Source: Cricket Archive

References

Super Fours